Aspich, (Persian: آسپیچ) is a village in Central District, Saravan County of Sistan and Baluchestan Province, Iran. At the 2006 census, its population was 2,819 (909 households). Road 92 passes through it.

References 

Districts of Sistan and Baluchestan Province